The medullary cavity (medulla, innermost part) is the central cavity of bone shafts where red bone marrow and/or yellow bone marrow (adipose tissue) is stored; hence, the medullary cavity is also known as the marrow cavity. 

Located in the main shaft of a long bone (diaphysis) (consisting mostly of compact bone), the medullary cavity has walls composed of spongy bone (cancellous bone) and is lined with a thin, vascular membrane (endosteum).

This area is involved in the formation of red blood cells and white blood cells, and the calcium supply for bird eggshells. The area has been detected in fossil bones despite the fossilization process.

Intramedullary is a medical term meaning the inside of a bone. Examples include intramedullary rods used to treat bone fractures in orthopedic surgery and intramedullary tumors occurring in some forms of cancer or benign tumors such as an enchondroma.

References

External links
 

Skeletal system